The 2021 Las Vegas Bowl was a college football bowl game played on December 30, 2021, with kickoff at 10:30 p.m. EST (7:30 p.m. local PST) on ESPN. It was the 29th edition of the Las Vegas Bowl (after the 2020 edition was cancelled due to the COVID-19 pandemic), and was one of the 2021–22 bowl games concluding the 2021 FBS football season. Sponsored by roofing distribution company SRS Distribution, the game was officially known as the SRS Distribution Las Vegas Bowl.

Teams
The bowl featured Wisconsin of the Big Ten Conference (Big Ten) and Arizona State of the Pac-12 Conference. This was the fifth meeting between the two programs, with Arizona State holding a 3–1 edge in previous meetings, the most recent occurring in 2013. This was Wisconsin's first trip to the Las Vegas Bowl. This was Arizona State's third trip to the Las Vegas Bowl. They lost their two previous trips (2011 to Boise State, and 2018 to Fresno State).

Wisconsin Badgers

Wisconsin, 8-4 (6-3 in conference play), have won six out of their last seven bowl game appearances. All-American linebacker Leo Chenal and freshman All-American tailback Braelon Allen are top players for the Badgers.

Arizona State Sun Devils

Arizona State entered the bowl with an 8–4 record overall, and a 6–3 record in Pac-12 play. The Sun Devils finished in second place in the conference's South Division, tied with UCLA.

Game summary

Statistics

References

External links
 Game statistics at statbroadcast.com

Las Vegas Bowl
Las Vegas Bowl
Arizona State Sun Devils football bowl games
Wisconsin Badgers football bowl games
Las Vegas Bowl
Las Vegas Bowl